Inositol polyphosphate 1-phosphatase is an enzyme that, in humans, is encoded by the INPP1 gene.
INPP1 encodes the enzyme inositol polyphosphate-1-phosphatase, one of the enzymes involved in phosphatidylinositol signaling pathways. This enzyme removes the phosphate group at position 1 of the inositol ring from the polyphosphates inositol 1,4-bisphosphate and inositol 1,3,4-trisphophosphate.

Model organisms

Model organisms have been used in the study of INPP1 function. A conditional knockout mouse line, called Inpp1tm1a(KOMP)Wtsi was generated as part of the International Knockout Mouse Consortium program — a high-throughput mutagenesis project to generate and distribute animal models of disease to interested scientists.

Male and female animals underwent a standardized phenotypic screen to determine the effects of deletion. Twenty four tests were carried out on mutant mice, and one significant abnormality was observed: a decreased susceptibility to bacterial infection.

References

Further reading

Genes mutated in mice